Zenkerella is a genus of plants in the family Fabaceae.

It contains the following species:
 Zenkerella capparidacea  
 Zenkerella citrina 
 Zenkerella egregia 
 Zenkerella grotei  
 Zenkerella perplexa 
 Zenkerella schliebenii   (also called Cynometra schliebenii)

Reference 

Detarioideae
Fabaceae genera
Taxonomy articles created by Polbot